Peter Robertson may refer to:

 Peter Robertson (triathlete) (born 1976), Olympic triathlete from Australia
 Peter Robertson (politician), Canadian politician
 Peter Robertson (footballer) (1875–1929), Scottish professional footballer who played as a half back
 Peter Robertson (golfer) (c. 1883–?), Scottish professional golfer
 Pete Robertson (born 1992), American football linebacker
 P. L. Robertson (Peter Lymburner Robertson, 1879–1951), Canadian inventor
 Peter Robertson (Jamaica), planter and slave-owner in Jamaica